Glyptopleura is a genus of North American plants in the family Asteraceae. The common names for this plant include carveseed, holy dandelion, keysia, and crustleaf.

This plant grows low to the ground from a flat basal rosette of distinctive lobed green leaves outlined in eye-catching hard white borders. The flesh is rich in milky sap. The flowers are ligulate, bearing long ray florets with toothed ends, which may be white, cream, or pale yellow.

 Species
 Glyptopleura marginata D.C.Eaton - California, Nevada, Utah, Oregon, Idaho
 Glyptopleura setulosa A.Gray - California, Nevada, Utah, Arizona

References

External links
 Jepson Manual Treatment
 USDA Plants Profile
 Photo gallery

Asteraceae genera
Flora of the United States
Cichorieae